The bandit conflict in northwest Nigeria is an ongoing conflict between the country's government and various gangs and ethnic militias. Starting in 2011, the insecurity remaining from the conflict between the Fulani and Hausa ethnic groups quickly allowed other criminal and jihadist elements to form in the region.

Origins 
The origins of the bandit conflict can be traced back to herder-farmer conflicts that plague Nigeria. Environmental decline and the scarcity of water and arable land led to communities competing viciously for those limited resources. Unemployment, large-scale poverty and weak local government have allowed for a steady stream of desperate people turning to criminal activity to earn a living. Large forested areas allow for concealment and the formation of camps deep in the forest. Unequipped police and military personnel are unable to reach these areas.

Escalation 
Continued insecurity, desertification and possible jihadist influence have allowed for a rise in attacks to take place. Large-scale weapon smuggling has allowed criminal gangs access to heavy weapons, increasing the deadliness of attacks which has affected the lives and lost of property worth billions of dollars, the presence of these group has drove away foreign investment. Under equipped local and federal forces, coupled with the harsh terrain, make offensive actions into the forest dangerous and susceptible to ambushes and attacks. Continued government inability to effectively deal with the problem has allowed the insecurity to spread and grow in ferocity.

Kidnapping 
Bandits in Nigeria have been known to ride into villages on motorcycles to loot and kidnap the inhabitants, killing anyone who resists. Kidnapping is a very profitable venture in northwest Nigeria. Between 2011 and 2020, Nigerians paid at least 18 million naira to free family members and friends.

Arms trade
Illegal arms are prevalent in northwest Nigeria. Bandit gangs control gold mines and use the gold to purchase arms from internal and international arms dealers. There are an estimated 60,000 illegal weapons in circulation in northwest Nigeria. The border of northern Nigeria is undefended, with only 1,950 personnel to police the whole border, making it easy for smuggling across the border.

Belligerents

In Zamfara state alone, there are (as of 2021) over 30,000 bandits and 100 camps.

Ali Kachalla 
Ali Kachalla is a bandit leader in his early 30s who was born in a small town called Madada near Dansadau. Kachalla controls a bandit group of about 200 in the Kuyambana Forest. His main base of operations consists of several huts along the Goron Dutse River, about 25 km south of Dansadau. Kachalla's gang directly controls the villages of  Dandalla, Madada and Gobirawa Kwacha, from where he launches attacks on Dansadau and other neighboring communities. Kachalla's gang is allied with Dogo Gide's nomadic gang.

Kachalla's gang has carried out numerous attacks, most notably the downing of a Nigerian Air Force Alpha Jet on 18 June 2021 and the destruction of a Mowag Piranha armored personnel carrier in Dansadau on 23 July 2021. Kachalla's gang has suffered defeats, most notably losing 30 men in a battle with an Ansaru cell.

Dogo Gide 
Abubakar Abdullahi, known as Dogo Gide, is the leader of a bandit group near Dansadau. He is from Maru local government and is in his 40s, married with children. He is known for killing bandit leader Buharin Daji and 24 of Daji's gang members by luring Daji to a peace meeting. He also killed a rival bandit leader named Damina who had attacked villages under Gide's control. Mr Gide is believed to have formed criminal ties with Boko Haram in the last quarter of 2019. He is also believed to have the financial capacity and connections to procure weapons. He is believed to have masterminded lots of kidnapping one of which included the kidnapping of scores of students from the Federal Government College Yauri in Kebbi State in June.

Kachalla Halilu Sububu Seno
Kachalla Halilu Sububu Seno is the leader of a Fulani bandit group. He commands over 1,000 bandits in the Sububu Forest across Zamfara State and has connections to bandit groups across the west African countries of  Mali, Senegal, Burkina Faso, Cameroon and the Central African Republic. He signed a peace treaty with the city of Shinkafi but has shifted his activities elsewhere. He is a leader of about 1000 bandits located in Zamfara State.  HIs men are known for launching attacks and kidnapping of villagers and travellers in Sabon Birni, Rabah and Isa Local Government in Sokoto State their tentacles reaches as far as Katsina State. Halilu happens to be one of Nigeria's most dreaded Bandits having built a formidable army of young men and stocking up on weapons. Two years ago communities in Shinkafi had a peace deal with Halilu's gang to ensure the relative peace they enjoy now.

Kachalla Turji
Kachalla Turji, also known as Gudda Turji, is the leader of a bandit group that operates along Sokoto Road, raiding towns, villages and settlements in the area. On 17 July 2021, Kachalla Turji's main base was raided by security personnel, where they arrested his father. Kachalla Turji then attacked the villages of Kurya, Keta, Kware, Badarawa, Marisuwa and Maberaya, killing 42, abducting 150 and burning 338 houses. He was originally from Shinkafi Local Government of Zamfara State.

Dan Karami
Dan Karami is the leader of a bandit gang that operates around Safana, Dan Musa, and Batsari local government areas. Karami's group is responsible for kidnapping 300 students from a secondary boarding school. On 23 January 2021, Karami was injured during a clash with a rival group headed by Mani Na Saleh Mai Dan Doki over the control of guns, ammunition and stolen cattle. The clash took place at Illela village and killed 20 of Dan Karami's bandits and nine civilians.

Adamu Aliero Yankuzo

Adamu Aliero Yankuzo, better known as Yankuzo, is the leader of a bandit group that operates in the forested regions of Katsina and Zamfara states. He controls a bandit group numbering about 2,000. Yankuzo is 45 years old and was born in Yankuzo village. He has at least one son. On 16 June 2020, Yankuzo was declared wanted by the Katsina State Police Command for five million Nigerian naira. Yankuzo's gang has carried out a number of attacks, including the killing 52 people in Kadisau village in revenge for the arrest of his son on 9 June 2020. He was declared wanted after his gang members conffessed to the kidnapping of innocent villagers, killing of women and rustling of more than hundreds of cattle.

Jihadist groups
ISWAP and Boko Haram have both claimed to have carried out attacks in northwest Nigeria, and some bandit groups have claimed to have formed alliances with the jihadist groups. In a phone call intercepted by American intelligence in October 2021, an unnamed jihadist group and a bandit group discussed kidnapping operations and negotiations between the groups.

Boko Haram is also believed to have sent specialized personnel, including bomb makers and military advisors, as well as military equipment to the Kaduna state to train and equip their bandit groups' allies.

Ansaru resurgence
Ansaru, a jihadist group linked with al-Qaeda, is believed to have been operating in the Kaduna state. It is believed they enter Nigeria through the porosity of the Niger and Benin Republic border with Nigeria.  After going silent in 2013, Ansaru began attacking Nigerian military and police personnel and infrastructure, including an ambush of a Nigerian military convoy on 15 January 2020. Due to Nigeria having large ungoverned Forest by successive government most of these terrorist and bandit groups have turned some forests in the Northern region of Nigeria to their operational base. In March 2020, the governor Kaduna State Governor Nasiro Ahmed El Rufa'i state that there will be no negotiation or pardon for bandits and terrorist groups in the State.

Bello Turji
Bello Turji Kachalla is the leader of a bandits and kidnappers gang that operates in the Zamfara and Sokoto states. He was known to have imposed levies on many villages and appointed leaders in two of the eastern Sokoto Villages. He was notorious and ruthless that he refuse to accept ransom after He kidnapped the father of the Zamafara House of Assembly speaker which eventually led to the elderly man's unfortunate demise. He was said to have little of Western education but vast in the Islamic Education and also had a good family background. According to a Lecturer Dr. Murtala, Turji's group members are from influential family some of which includes Umaru Nagona,, Mallam Ina Manara ,Bello Kagara and so many more.

Refugees
At least 247,000 people have been displaced and 120 villages have been razed in continuing bandit activity in northwest Nigeria. At least 77,000 of the displaced have been forced into Niger's Maradi Region, where cross-border raids and attacks continue. At least 11,320 refugees have been successfully relocated.

Timeline

Nigerian government operations

Operation Harbin Kunama 
On 8 July 2016, president Muhammadu Buhari announced that the Nigerian military would launch a military operation code-named Operation Harbin Kunama. The operation was carried out by the 223 armored battalion of the 1 Mechanised Division and targeted bandit groups in the Dansadau Forest. In the days before the announcement, convoys carried new military equipment into the Zamfara state, including tanks and armoured fighting vehicles.

Operation Sharan Daji 
In early 2016, Operation Sharan Daji was launched by the Nigerian military to combat bandits in the northwest. The operation was conducted by 31 Artillery Brigade and 2 Battalion of the first 1 Mechanised Division. By March 2016, 35 bandits were killed, 36 guns were seized, 6,009 cattle were recovered, 49 bandit camps were destroyed and 38 bandits were captured. In the year 2019, the Nigerian Army  confirmed the killing of four bandits under the Operation Sharan Daji. During the operation the troops recovered three AK-47, three dane guns and two G3 rifles, some AK 47 magazines and others.

Operation Accord
On 5 June 2020, the Nigerian military launched Operation Accord, which established a joint task force of vigilantes and troops of the 312 Artillery Regiment. An air and ground offensive was launched on the same day on which the operation was announced, killing more than 70 bandits. The operation led to the destruction of multiple bandit camps, including a camp belonging to Ansaru.

Major bandit attacks

2020
18 April, April 2020 Katsina attacks
11 December, Kankara kidnapping

2021
24–25 February, February 2021 Kaduna and Katsina attacks
26 February, Zamfara kidnapping
11 March, Afaka kidnapping
20 April, Greenfield University kidnapping
3 June 2021 Kebbi massacre
11–12 June, Zurmi massacre
14 June, Kebbi kidnapping
5 July, Chikun kidnapping

2022
4–6 January, 2022 Zamfara massacres
14–15 January, Dankade massacre
8 March 2022 Kebbi massacres
26 March, a gang of 200 bandits targeted Kaduna International Airport. A security guard was killed but the military successfully managed to repel the bandits.
28 March, Abuja–Kaduna train attack - a train heading from Abuja to Kaduna was attacked in Katari, Kaduna state, killing 60 passengers.
10 April 2022 Plateau State massacres.

References

Conflicts in Nigeria
Conflicts in 2011
 
Organized crime conflicts
2010s conflicts
2020s conflicts